In frame semantics, a theory of linguistic meaning, null instantiation is the name of a category used to annotate, or tag, absent semantic constituents or frame elements (Fillmore et al. 2003, Section 3.4).  Frame semantics, best exemplified by the FrameNet project, views words as evoking frames of knowledge and frames as typically involving multiple components, called frame elements (e.g. buyer and goods in an acquisition). The term null refers to the fact that the frame element in question is absent.  The logical object of the term instantiation refers to the frame element itself.  So, null instantiation is an empty instantiation of a frame element. Ruppenhofer and Michaelis postulate an implicational regularity tying the interpretation type of an omitted argument to the frame membership of its predicator: "If a particular frame element role is lexically omissible under a particular interpretation (either anaphoric or existential) for one LU [lexical unit] in a frame, then for any other LUs in the same frame that allow the omission of this same FE [frame element], the interpretation of the missing FE is the same." (Ruppenhofer and Michaelis 2014: 66)

Definite null instantiation
Definite null instantiation is the absence of a frame element that is recoverable from the context.  It is similar to a zero anaphor.

Indefinite null instantiation
Indefinite null instantiation is the absence of the object of a potentially transitive verb such as eat or drink.

Constructional null instantiation
Constructional null instantiation is the absence of a frame element due to a syntactic construction, e.g. the optional omission of agents in passive sentences.

See also
 Frame semantics
 Anaphora
 Ellipsis

References
 Fillmore, Charles J.; Christopher R. Johnson; and Miriam R. L. Petruck (2003)  Background to FrameNet.  'International Journal of Lexicography' 16(3):235-250.
 Fillmore, Charles J. (1986) Pragmatically Controlled Zero Anaphora. 'Proceedings of the Twelfth Annual Meeting of the Berkeley Linguistic Society'.
 Ruppenhofer, Josef and Laura A. Michaelis (2014) Frames and the Interpretation of Omitted Arguments in English. In S. Katz Bourns and L. Myers, (eds.), Linguistic Perspectives on Structure and Context: Studies in Honor of Knud Lambrecht. Amsterdam: Benjamins. 57-86.

Specific

Semantics